The 2017 Primera División season was the 36th professional season of Venezuela's top-flight football league. Zamora were the defending champions, but did not qualify to the Serie Final, after being eliminated by Monagas in the quarter-finals of the Torneo Apertura and by Deportivo Lara in the quarter-finals of the Torneo Clausura.

Monagas were the champions, defeating Deportivo Lara in the Serie Final, 2–1 on aggregate.

Teams

Stadia and locations

{|

|}

Personnel and kits

Managerial changes

Torneo Apertura

The Torneo Apertura was the first tournament of the season. The regular season started on 28 January and finished on 21 May 2017.

Results

Knockout stage

Quarter-finals

|}

First leg

Second leg

Semi-finals

|}

First leg

Second leg

Final

2–2 on aggregate. Monagas won on away goals.

Top goalscorers

Top assists

Awards

Team of the Tournament
 
The Asociación FUTVE chose the team of the Torneo Apertura.

Player of the Tournament 
The best player of Torneo Apertura was Monagas winger Anthony Blondell, chosen by the Asociación FUTVE.

Torneo Clausura
The Torneo Clausura was the second tournament of the season. The regular season started on 15 July and finished on 29 October 2017.

Results

Knockout stage

Quarter-finals

|}

First leg

Second leg

Semi-finals

|}

First leg

Second leg

Final

1–1 on aggregate. Deportivo Lara won 4–3 on penalties.

Top goalscorers

Awards

Team of the Tournament
 
The Asociación FUTVE chose the team of the Torneo Clausura.

Player of the Tournament 
The best player of Torneo Clausura was Deportivo Lara goalkeeper Carlos Salazar, chosen by the Asociación FUTVE.

Serie Final
The Serie Final is held between the champions of the Torneo Apertura and the Torneo Clausura to determine the champions of the season. The draw to determine the order of the legs was held on 4 December 2017.

First leg

Second leg

Monagas won 2–1 on aggregate.

Aggregate table

Awards

Torneo Apertura

Player of the Matchday

Monthly awards

Torneo Clausura

Player of the Matchday

Annual awards

Player of the Year

The best player of the 2017 season was Monagas forward Anthony Blondell, chosen by the Asociación FUTVE.

Team of the Year

The Asociación FUTVE chose the team of the season.

References

External links
  of the Venezuelan Football Federation 

Venezuelan Primera División season
Venezuelan Primera División seasons
1